LBR may refer to:

Places
 Liberia, by FIFA, IOC, International Telecommunication Union and ISO 3166-1 country codes
 London Borough of Redbridge, England
 Lady Beaverbrook Residence, a residence house at the University of New Brunswick

Rail
 Leighton Buzzard Railway, England
 Llanbedr railway station, UK railway station
 London and Birmingham Railway, an early railway company in the United Kingdom from 1833 to 1846
 Lowville and Beaver River Railroad, a short-line railroad owned by Genesee Valley Transportation (GVT) of Batavia, New York, US
 Lynton and Barnstaple Railway, England, opened as an independent railway in 1898

Sports
 Liga Bolasepak Rakyat, fourth-tier football league in Malaysia

Other uses
 Legal Bill Review
 LBR (file format), the file-name extension for a computer file format for archiving files on CP/M and early MS-DOS systems
 Lamin B receptor, a protein that in humans is encoded by the LBR gene
 Leichtbauroboter (German for Lightweight robot).
 Lenny B. Robinson (Baltimore Batman)